Nation.1 was a project to create what was described as an "online country" – a conceptual country based on the Internet. It was to be owned, populated and governed by the children of the world. Its borders were defined by the age of its citizens, as opposed to geography or ethnicity. The central goal of Nation.1 was to empower young people with a voice and representation in world affairs.

History
The Nation.1 concept began as a challenge by Nicholas Negroponte to a group of young delegates of the 2B1 conference at the MIT Media Lab in 1997. Several of these delegates had attended the GII Junior Summit in 1995, and others were part of the Generation Why Project in Olympia, Washington.

Nation.1 was announced publicly in a 1997 teleconference to the United Nations Committee on the Rights of the Child, in a series of speeches at the Massachusetts State House and in an article in Wired magazine. The project was further developed by delegates at the Junior Summit 1998 conference, during which it adopted the use of Swatch Internet Time. In the following years Nation.1 was incorporated as a non-profit organization for youth empowerment. The Nation.1 foundation, its executive director and its assets merged officially with TakingITGlobal in 2001.

Although Nation.1 is not directly related to the One Laptop per Child project, both projects were informed by the 2B1 conference, the GII Junior Summit '95 and the Junior Summit '98.

The Nation.1 project explored a variety of translation and governance technologies as well as a variety of concepts key to the construction of a country. New approaches to youth-empowerment and autonomous self-government through the use of decentralized internet voting systems were discussed, as were topics relating to citizenship, education, economic exchange, trust, identification, and a usable international definition on what constitutes childhood.

On this last question, an arbitrary boundary of 25 years of age and under was eventually established, although the variables of this boundary were widely discussed. John Perry Barlow put in a request that the young at heart be admitted as ambassadors from the adult world, or at least be granted temporary visas.

Technology
Alan Kay recommended using a wiki in the formation of Nation1, three years before the founding of Wikipedia. His advice led to the use of a wiki to help form the founding texts of the nation. A database-driven website and email mailing lists were used as the initial communication system, while the central committee laid plans for multi-lingual chat system and a distributed decision-making system called the Democracy Engine.

Key people
 John Perry Barlow
 Brandon Bruce
 Terah DeJong
 Marco D'Alimonte
 Maitreyi Doshi
 Talena Foster
 Alan Kay
 Lauren Keane
 Hayley Goodwin
 Ragni Marea Kidvai
 Kanetaka Maki
 Nick Moraitis
 Nicholas Negroponte
 Dimitri Negroponte
 Thomas O'Duffy
 Laetitia Garriott de Cayeux
 Ryan Powell
 Warren Sack
 David Sontag
 Tannie Kwong
 Emily Kumpel
 Gerald Tan
 Nusrah Wali
 Ian Wojtowicz
 Jacob Wolfsheimer

See also
 A Declaration of the Independence of Cyberspace
 Nationalism
 2B1

Notes

External links
 Nation.1's website archive

Information and communication technologies for development
1997 introductions
Organizations established in 1997
2001 mergers and acquisitions